XHRTA-FM is a radio station on 92.7 FM in Aguascalientes City, Aguascalientes, Mexico. It is owned by the state government through its Radio y Televisión de Aguascalientes division.

Format
When the station signed on in late 2000, it was known as "Alternativa"; the station often aired older music. Since the beginning of the government of Luis Armando Reynoso, 92.7 FM began airing more jazz programming.

In early 2018, a format swap was conducted with co-owned XHNM-FM, in which 92.7 became Tu Estación and the Alternativa programming began airing on 98.1.

References

Mass media in Aguascalientes City
Public radio in Mexico
Radio stations established in 2000
Radio stations in Aguascalientes
Spanish-language radio stations